Dancing Undercover is the third studio album by American glam metal band Ratt, released in 1986. The album was produced by Beau Hill and contains the hit single/video "Dance", which appeared in the Miami Vice episode "Down for the Count". Two other videos were made, "Body Talk", which was used on the soundtrack for Eddie Murphy's film, The Golden Child, and "Slip of the Lip". It charted at No. 26 on the Billboard 200 chart and at No. 14 on Rolling Stone's Album Chart. The album went platinum.

Ratt's opening acts on the tour in support of the album included Poison, Cinderella, Cheap Trick, Queensrÿche and Vinnie Vincent Invasion.

Track listing 

Early pressings of the CD had "Slip of the Lip" and "Body Talk" errantly mastered into one track as track 4.

Personnel
Ratt
 Stephen Pearcy – lead vocals
 Robbin Crosby – lead guitar, backing vocals
 Warren DeMartini – lead guitar, backing vocals
 Juan Croucier – bass, backing vocals
 Bobby Blotzer – drums, percussion

Production
Beau Hill – producer, engineer
Michael O'Reilly, Jim Faraci – engineers
Jimmy Hoyson – assistant engineer
Stephen Benben – digital editing and sequencing
Ted Jensen – mastering at Sterling Sound, New York City

Charts

Album

Singles

Certifications

References 

Ratt albums
1986 albums
Atlantic Records albums
Albums produced by Beau Hill